{{Infobox professional wrestler 
|name=José the Assistant
|birth_name=José Garcia 
|image=
|caption=
|birthname=
|names=Andy TovarezJosé VargasOrionPrincipe Orion José the Assistant
|height=6 ft 0 in
|weight=189lb
|birth_date= 1985 (age 37)
|birth_place=East Los Angeles, California
|billed= Los Angeles, California
|name(s)= 
|trainer=Ultimo GuerreroDurango KidSkaydeKendo KashinChilangoSuper Boy
|debut=2007
|retired=}}José García (born 1985) is an American professional wrestler and manager currently working for All Elite Wrestling (AEW) under the ring name José the Assistant''', serving as the manager of Andrade El Ídolo.

Professional wrestling career

Early career 
José García began wrestling for various independent promotions around California and Mexico, mainly competing under the ring names Orion and Principe Orion. García also made appearances for World Wrestling Entertainment first on the August 18, 2011 episode of WWE Superstars, wrestling under the name Jose Vargas in a loss to Brodus Clay. García's next, and last, appearance for WWE was on the August 20, 2012 episode of Raw, where he teamed with Mike Spinner in a losing effort to Ryback.

All Elite Wrestling (2018–present)
After a hiatus from in-ring competition that began in September 2018, García began making appearances for All Elite Wrestling (AEW) in 2021 under the name José the Assistant.

References 

Living people
People from Los Angeles
Professional wrestlers from California
1986 births
All Elite Wrestling personnel